Mya Phu Ngon (born 10 August 1989) is a Burmese footballer who plays as a goalkeeper for the Myanmar women's national team.

References

1989 births
Living people
Women's association football goalkeepers
Burmese women's footballers
People from Shan State
Myanmar women's international footballers